Penn House is a historic home located at Reidsville, Rockingham County, North Carolina. The main house was built in 1932, and is a -story, Colonial Revival style blond brick dwelling.  The house consists of the main block; a one-story, L-shaped wing; a one-story servants' quarters; and a one-story kitchen wing behind the main block. The front facade features a full-facade, full-height portico with six Corinthian order columns.   It replaced a Prairie School inspired dwelling erected on the site about 1910.  Also on the property are the contributing two-story garage and servants' apartment (c. 1914–1922); smokehouse (before 1922); slate-roofed gazebo; pump house (1922-1929); and two greenhouses.

It was listed on the National Register of Historic Places in 1983. It is located in the Reidsville Historic District.

References

Houses on the National Register of Historic Places in North Carolina
Colonial Revival architecture in North Carolina
Houses completed in 1932
Houses in Rockingham County, North Carolina
National Register of Historic Places in Rockingham County, North Carolina
Historic district contributing properties in North Carolina